Chandler Mill Bridge, also known as Chester County Bridge No. 236, is a historic steel bridge located in Kennett Township, Chester County, Pennsylvania. It spans the West Branch of Red Clay Creek.  It is a single span, built up steel plate girder bridge.  The bridge was constructed in 1910, and features stone abutments and wingwalls.

It was listed on the National Register of Historic Places in 2010.

The bridge has been closed since May 6, 2011, due to its deteriorating condition.

References 
 

Road bridges on the National Register of Historic Places in Pennsylvania
Bridges completed in 1910
Bridges in Chester County, Pennsylvania
National Register of Historic Places in Chester County, Pennsylvania
Steel bridges in the United States
Plate girder bridges in the United States